Henry Charles Krug  (December 4, 1876 – January 14, 1908) was an outfielder in Major League Baseball for the 1902 Philadelphia Phillies.

External links

1876 births
1908 deaths
Major League Baseball outfielders
Major League Baseball second basemen
Philadelphia Phillies players
Baseball players from San Francisco
Petaluma Poison Oaks players
California of San Francisco players
San Francisco Metropolitans players
San Francisco Athletics players
San Francisco A's players
San Francisco Brewers players
San Francisco Wasps players
Atlanta Firemen players
San Francisco Seals (baseball) players
Atlanta Crackers players
Portland Browns players
Scranton Miners players
Indianapolis Indians players
San Francisco (minor league baseball) players
San Jose (minor league baseball) players